The 1932 SMU Mustangs football team represented Southern Methodist University (SMU) as a member of the Southwest Conference (SWC) during the 1932 college football season. Led by 13th-year head coach Ray Morrison, the Mustangs compiled an overall record of 3–7–2 with a mark of 1–4–1 in conference play, tying for fifth place in the SWC.

Schedule

References

SMU
SMU Mustangs football seasons
SMU Mustangs football